The 2003 2 Hour Showroom Showdown Race was an endurance race for Australian GT Production Cars. The event was staged at the Mount Panorama Circuit, Bathurst, New South Wales, Australia on Saturday 22 November 2003 as a support event on the program for the 2003 Bathurst 24 Hour. This was the seventh and final Showroom Showdown production car endurance race.

Rod Salmon and Grant Park, driving a Subaru Impreza WRX STi won the race by 27 seconds ahead of the Mazda RX-7 driven by Bob Pearson with the Ford Falcon-based Tickford TE50 of John Falk finishing third.

Class structure
Cars competed in the following three classes:
Class A : GT-Performance class cars
Class B : Mitsubishi Mirage Cup
Class C : GT-Production class cars

Results

References

 Natsoft Race Result*

Motorsport in Bathurst, New South Wales
2 Hour